Gojōrō Katsuhiro (born 18 August 1973 as Akitomo Kojima) is a former sumo wrestler from Aoba-ku, Sendai, Japan. Making his professional debut in 1989, he spent a total of 53 tournaments as an elite sekitori ranked wrestler, reaching a highest rank of maegashira 3 in 1998. After a number of injury problems he retired in 2005 at the age of 32. He is now a sumo coach under the name Hamakaze-oyakata.

Career
As a teenager he did judo and fencing. He was recruited by former yokozuna Wakanohana of the Magaki stable. He made his debut in November 1989 at the age of 16. After very briefly having shikona based on his own surname of Kojima, in 1990 he was given the name Wakasenryū, which was modified to Wakatenryū in the following year. In January 1992 he reached the third highest makushita division, although he was able to score only two wins and five losses. He responded with his first ever yūshō, a perfect 7-0 record in sandanme, which earned him immediate promotion back to makushita. However, in 1993 he missed four successive tournaments, which saw him drop all the way down to the rank of jonidan 52.

After another shikona change to Gojōrō, he returned to the dohyō in November 1993, winning 14 straight bouts and quick promotion back to makushita. In May 1995 a 6-1 performance at the rank of makushita 4 saw him promoted to the jūryō division for the first time, alongside  his stablemate, the Hawaiian born Yamato. He moved steadily up the division, and an 8-7 score at jūryō 1 in January 1997 was enough to see him promoted to the top makuuchi division in March. He dropped to jūryō after three tournaments but returned to makuuchi in January 1998 and a fine performance in May, when he recovered from 3-6 down to score 9-6, saw him promoted to his highest ever rank of maegashira 3 for the July 1998 basho. However, he was pitched against all the top ranked wrestlers for the first time, including three yokozuna and two ōzeki, and he finished with a 3-12 record.

In 1999 Gojōrō slipped back into the jūryō division, and he suffered a number of injury problems over the next couple of years. He went 4-4-7, 0-0-15, 7-7-1, 0-0-15 in the four tournaments from September 1999 to March 2000, but due to the kōshō seido (public injury) system he was able to stay in jūryō. However, yet another withdrawal in the September 2000 tournament on Day 5 saw him demoted back to makushita. It took him some time to recover from his injuries and return to the top ranks, but he collected two makushita yūshō on the way (both perfect 7-0 scores), and in September 2002 he finally returned to makuuchi after twenty tournaments away. He climbed to maegashira 4 in November 2002, and fought three ōzeki, but was unable to beat any and finished on 4-11.

Gojoro's return to makuuchi was unfortunately short-lived, as yet more injury problems struck him in July 2003, when he was forced to pull out on Day 8 with only four wins and was demoted back to jūryō. Sitting out the September 2003 basho, he returned in November but had a disastrous tournament. Not only did he become the first wrestler in sumo history to suffer hansoku (disqualification) twice in one basho after he was judged to have pulled the topknot of Kokkai on Day 4 and Ushiomaru on Day 6, but he was injured again on Day 8 and had to pull out. He missed the January 2004 tournament as well, but the public injury system once again kept him at sekitori level. He was one of the last wrestlers to benefit from it as the system was abolished after this tournament.

He struggled on in jūryō until May 2005, when on Day 7 he was injured during a bout with Kotokasuga that was declared too close to call. Unable to take part in the rematch, he lost by default and was unable to compete the next day as well. He thus became the first wrestler since Fujinoshin in  September 1989 to lose by default two days in a row. He did return to the tournament, only to drop out again after his eighth loss on Day 12. Demoted to makushita once again, he fought only four more matches before finally announcing his retirement in November 2005.

Retirement from sumo
Staying in the sumo world as a coach at his stable, he was allowed to use his old fighting name as his toshiyori or elder name for a year, giving him time to acquire full stock. In November 2006 he switched to the Hamakaze name after it was vacated by the former Misugisato. Faced with a stable that was deteriorating due to the poor health of Magaki-oyakata, in November 2007 he transferred to another stable in the same ichimon, Sadogatake, and took up coaching duties there.

Fighting style
Gojōrō used both yotsu-sumo (grappling) and oshi-sumo (pushing) techniques. He preferred a hidari-yotsu (right hand outside, left hand inside) grip on his opponent's mawashi, and often won by yorikiri or force out. However, his three most regularly used kimarite were oshidashi (push out), hatakikomi (slap down) and tsukidashi (thrust out).

Career record

See also
Glossary of sumo terms
List of past sumo wrestlers
List of sumo elders

References

External links

1973 births
Living people
Japanese sumo wrestlers
Sportspeople from Sendai
Sumo people from Miyagi Prefecture